Cis subfuscus is a species of minute tree-fungus beetle in the family Ciidae. It is found in Central America and North America.

References

Further reading

 
 
 
 

Ciidae
Articles created by Qbugbot
Beetles described in 1886